In the United states, a small cap company is a company whose market capitalization (shares x value of each share) is small, under $2 billion.

Overview

A small cap company typically has under $2 billion market cap and are hence considered small companies. Small companies generally are not able to secure the best (prime) borrowing rates and wield reduced power, including a smaller market share. Being small, they are also less financially stable than larger companies, and are more likely to become bankrupt. However, they do generally have more growth potential and over time have greater but more volatile expected returns.

See also 

 Market capitalization

Small business